Gaston Armel "Disney" Mamouma-Ossila (born January 7, 1980) is a retired Congolese football player. FIFA lists his name as Armel Mamouna-Ossila.

Armel began his football career in his native Republic of the Congo with Étoile du Congo, before moving abroad to play professionally in Romania and France. Armel made 50 Liga I appearances, playing for Internaţional Piteşti, Pandurii Târgu Jiu and Farul Constanţa. He made over 50 appearances in Liga II, including loan spells at Internaţional Piteşti and SCM Râmnicu Vâlcea.

He has made several appearances for the Congo national football team. Armel made his debut in a 2006 FIFA World Cup qualifier in June 2004, scoring a goal as Congo defeated Liberia 3–1.

References

External links

1980 births
Living people
Republic of the Congo footballers
Étoile du Congo players
FCV Farul Constanța players
Vendée Poiré-sur-Vie Football players
Association football forwards
Republic of the Congo expatriate footballers
Expatriate footballers in Romania
Republic of the Congo expatriate sportspeople in Romania
Liga I players
CS Pandurii Târgu Jiu players
FC Internațional Curtea de Argeș players
SCM Râmnicu Vâlcea players